Bridger is an unincorporated community and census-designated place (CDP) in Ziebach County, South Dakota, United States, within the Cheyenne River Indian Reservation. The population was 48 at the 2020 census. It was first listed as a CDP prior to the 2020 census.

Demographics

References 

Census-designated places in Ziebach County, South Dakota
Census-designated places in South Dakota